Ätran is a Swedish river. The river is about 240 km long, and has its source in Gullered, Västergötland, at a height of 332 m above  sea level. The river has its mouth in Falkenberg, Halland, where the river enters Kattegat.

The drainage basin has an area of 3,343 km², of which most is forest. The river is well known as a good place for fishing. It is comparatively unpolluted

A road used for thousands of years, Redvägen, followed the river. Along the road several battles took place during the medieval era.

Path, tributaries and drainage basin

The river passes through several minor lakes in Västergötland (Sörsjön, Nolsjö, Vinsarpsjö and Lönnern). By the time it reaches Åsunden, a lake of some size, it is about 1–2 m deep och 6–10 m wide. As the tributaries named Lillån join the river it gain considerably in size.

The largest tributary is Högvadsån. Other main tributaries are Assman (Lillån), which join the river close to Örsås church and Kalvån (Lillån), which join the river close to Östra Frölunda church.

The drainage basin include the major parts of Falkenberg, Svenljunga, Tranemo and  Ulricehamn Municipalities. Smaller parts of Falköping, Borås, Gislaved, Mark, Hylte and Varberg Municipalities are also part of the drainage basin. Within the basin 64 percent of the area is forest, 6 percent lakes, 7 percent bogs, 11 percent fields and 12 percent other.

The largest lakes within the basin are Åsunden (33,9 km²), Fegen (24,2), Sämsjön (9,2), Lönern (7,7) och  Kalven (6,6). In total there is about 200 km² of lakes within the basin. The water flow at Yngeredsfors Power Station has been kept record of. It was on average 37,2 m³/s during the years 1909-1967. The maximum flow was 275 m³/s, while the minimum flow was about 5–7 m³/s.

References

Rivers of Halland County
Götaland